Jabab Hamad (also spelled Jbab Hamad or Jibab Hamad) is a village in central Syria, administratively part of the Homs Governorate, east of Homs. Situated in the Syrian Desert (which is also called the Hamad Desert), nearby localities include Furqlus, al-Sayyid and Fatim al-Amuq to the west. According to the Central Bureau of Statistics, Jabab Hamad had a population of 378 in the 2004 census.

References

Populated places in Homs District